Stranks is a British surname.

Notable people with this surname include:
 Charles Stranks (1901–1981), British author
 Jonathan Stranks (born 1994), British gymnast 
 Sidney Stranks (c. 1868 – 1953), British trade unionist
 Susan Stranks (born 1938), British actress

See also
 Strank